A Bonnet is a variety of headgear, hat or cap 

Specific types of headgear referred to as "bonnets" may include

Scottish 
Blue bonnet, a distinctive woollen cap worn by men in Scotland from the 15th-18th centuries And its derivations:
Feather bonnet, worn by Scottish regiments
Glengarry, type of Scottish cap also called a Glengarry bonnet
Tam o' Shanter (cap)
 its military variant the Balmoral bonnet
 See also: Bluebonnet (disambiguation)

Native American 
War bonnet, feathered headgear worn as an earned military decoration by high-ranking Plains Indians

U.K. 
Tudor bonnet, worn during Tudor times, but has now become an academic doctoral cap at universities in the U.K.

Bonnet may also refer to

Places 
Bonnet, Meuse, commune in France
Bonnet Island, Tasmania, Australia

Transport 
Bonnet (wagon), a word for the canvas cover on covered wagons.
Automobiles René Bonnet, defunct French automobile manufacturer
Bonnet (car), a word for the hinged engine cover of a motor vehicle in Britain and Commonwealth countries, also known as a "hood" in U.S. and Canadian English

Sail 
 Piece of canvas laced to the bottom of a sail to make it bigger

Other uses 
Bonnet (surname)
Bonnet, engineering term for part of a valve
Bonnet, plumbing term for part of an irrigation sprinkler
Scotch bonnet, a variety of chilli pepper
Bonnet macaque, an Indian monkey
Bonnet, a minor antagonist from Five Nights at Freddy's: Sister Location
"Bonnet", a song by DaBaby featuring Pooh Shiesty (2022)